Love and Kisses is the international debut studio album by Australian singer Dannii Minogue. It was released by MCA Records on 3 June 1991, in the United Kingdom. The album, featuring artwork shot by Simon Fowler serves as the international issue of Minogue's original Australian debut album, Dannii, with two additional recordings and new mixes. In November 1991, the album was reissued worldwide, including Australia, as Love and Kisses and... with additional remixes. In August 1991, the album was certified Gold in the UK, and its reissue has sold more than 75,000 units. The album was reissued again in 2009 featuring B-sides and remixes.

Track listing

Standard edition

Love and Kisses and...
Reissued in December 1991, this version features the single mix of "Baby Love" and a re-recorded version of "I Don't Wanna Take This Pain" and four extended 12" mixes.

Deluxe edition (2009)
Remastered edition issued by Palare Records on 7 December 2009, includes the full album plus B-side, "Hallucination".

Charts

Weekly charts

Year-end charts

Certifications

Release history

Love and Kisses: Video Collection
A collection of music videos produced to promote the album's singles was released on 2 December 1992 by MCA Records. The VHS reached number 23 on the UK video chart.

Track listing
 "Jump to the Beat"
 "Love and Kisses"
 "I Don't Wanna Take This Pain"
 "$ucce$$"
 "Baby Love"
 Interview and Home and Away footage

Dannii and Party Jam 

Dannii is the original debut album by Australian singer Dannii Minogue. It was released by Mushroom Records in October 1990 for the Australian market only. The album was released in Japan by Alpha Records in April 1991 for the Japanese market under the title Party Jam, and later released in the European and again in the Japan market with a slightly altered track listing, and entitled Love and Kisses.

Track listing 

Notes
 "Love and Kisses" (Dancin' Danny D 7" Mix) is used on the Japan release.

Chart performance

Release history

References

1991 debut albums
Dannii Minogue albums
MCA Records albums
Mushroom Records albums